This is a list of notable events in country music that took place in 2019.

Events
January 21 - Carrie Underwood gives birth to second son, Jacob Fisher, with husband Mike Fisher.
February - Country music duo Walker McGuire disbands.
February 10 – At the 61st Annual Grammy Awards, Kacey Musgraves wins all 4 awards she was nominated for, including the all-genre Album of the Year for Golden Hour.
March – "Old Town Road," a song combining elements of country rap, hip hop, Southern hip hop and trap and performed by rap newcomer Lil Nas X, debuts on the Hot Country Songs chart at No. 19; the song that charts is a remix, featuring vocals by Billy Ray Cyrus. However, the very next week, the song is removed from the chart, with the magazine disqualifying the song on the grounds that it did not fit the country genre. There is speculation that had the song remained on the chart, it would have reached No. 1 as of the chart dated April 6, 2019. On July 29 it reaches its seventeenth week atop the Billboard Hot 100, the all-time record. Later in the year, hip-hop music producer Blanco Brown records and releases "The Git Up," which is called a "sequel" and "next viral country rap song". The new style of music and its related controversies continue the long-standing discussion of what is country music, one that dates to the 1970s.
March 6 – Brandi Carlile, Amanda Shires and Maren Morris officially announce that they are forming a supergroup known as the Highwomen. With the name paying homage to  the Highwaymen (which was composed of Johnny Cash, Waylon Jennings, Willie Nelson and Kris Kristofferson), the trio revealed that their line-up would allow for various guests to join them, with Chely Wright, Courtney Marie Andrews, Margo Price, Sheryl Crow and Janelle Monáe all hinted as potential collaborators. The group reveal their fourth member will be Natalie Hemby and perform together for the first time at Loretta Lynn's 87th birthday concert by singing "It Wasn't God Who Made Honky Tonk Angels".
March 27 – Wanda Jackson announces her retirement from performing due to health and safety concerns via a statement on her Facebook page.
April 1 – Loretta Lynn celebrates her 87th birthday (which is actually April 14) with an all-star concert held at Nashville's Bridgestone Arena. Performers include: Garth Brooks, Trisha Yearwood, Martina McBride, Alison Krauss, Lee Ann Womack, Little Big Town, Margo Price, Kacey Musgraves, Brandy Clark, Cam, Jack White, Brandi Carlile, Maren Morris, Amanda Shires, Natalie Hemby, Holly Williams, Miranda Lambert, Pistol Annies, Keith Urban, Randy Houser, Darius Rucker, Tanya Tucker, Crystal Gayle, Peggy Sue, John Carter Cash, Alan Jackson and George Strait. Lynn herself sings live for the first time since 2017, performing her signature song "Coal Miner's Daughter" with the ensemble.
 April 14 – Hal Ketchum's wife announces via his Facebook page that he will be retiring due to complications from Alzheimer's disease.
April 16 – Kelsea Ballerini is inducted as the youngest member of the Grand Ole Opry, with Carrie Underwood officiating the induction.
May 14
Randy Travis releases his first memoir, titled Forever and Ever, Amen: A Memoir of Music, Faith, and Braving the Storms of Life.
Rodney Atkins' "Caught Up in the Country" charts for a 57th week on Country Airplay, beating by one week the previous record for the longest continuous run on that chart.
June 6 – Granger Smith's youngest son, River Kelly, unexpectedly dies at the age of 3 after what he refers to as a "serious accident", later revealed to be caused by drowning in the family pool. River had previously been featured as a cameo in Smith's "Happens Like That" video 2 years prior.
June 30 - Music executive and manager Scooter Braun buys Big Machine Label Group, which includes the masters to Taylor Swift's first 6 studio albums. Swift is angry, claiming that she tried to buy the masters herself for years, but Braun sells them to Ithaca Holdings for $300 million in November 2020. As a result, Swift began re-recording her albums that she originally recorded on the label in November 2020. The first of these, Fearless (Taylor's Version), was released in April 2021.
August 19 – Carrie Underwood is announced as host of the CMA Awards, her first year without Brad Paisley as a co-host; Dolly Parton and Reba McEntire will co-host the show.
September 9 - Blake Shelton creates a Twitter campaign for Craig Morgan's current single, "The Father, My Son and the Holy Ghost", written in memory of his 19-year-old son, Jerry Greer, who died in July 2016, to be No. 1 on iTunes' all-genre chart. Celebrities ranging from Kelly Clarkson to Ellen DeGeneres to Travis Tritt respond, and the song reaches No. 1 on Sept. 12, 2019.
September 15–25 – Country Music, a 16.5 hour documentary series by Ken Burns airs on PBS. The series took eight years to film and research, and features interviews with over 100 artists and key members of the country music community, including several who were interviewed prior to their untimely deaths within the decade.
September 19 – One of Josh Turner's tour buses crashes off a cliff in California, killing one and injuring seven. Turner himself was not on the bus at the time.
October 5 - American Idol finalists Gabby Barrett and Cade Foehner are married in Texas.
 October 9 – Radio host Bob Kingsley, host of Bob Kingsley's Country Top 40 (and earlier the longtime host of American Country Countdown), announces that he is taking a leave from the show due to a diagnosis of bladder cancer. Eight days later, Kingsley died from his illness.
 October 13 – Kenny Dixon, the drummer in Kane Brown's band, is killed in a car accident.
 October 19 – The Lifetime network premieres the television film Patsy & Loretta, which showcases the friendship between Patsy Cline and Loretta Lynn. Megan Hilty and Jessie Mueller portray Cline and Lynn, respectively.
November 13 - The 2019 CMA Awards celebrates women in country music, opening with an all-star medley that included the likes of Tanya Tucker and Sara Evans, while Maren Morris wins Album of the Year for Girl and Kacey Musgraves wins for Female Vocalist. The night also sparked controversy, as Garth Brooks wins Entertainer of the Year, causing backlash from Carrie Underwood and Eric Church fans, whom many predicted would win the honor.
November 22 - Singer Maddie Marlow of duo Maddie & Tae weds Jonah Font.
 December 8 – The 2019 Kennedy Center Honors award Linda Ronstadt; tribute performers included Trisha Yearwood and Carrie Underwood.
 December 18 – Radio host Fitz is named as the successor of Bob Kingsley on Bob Kingsley's Country Top 40.
 December 28 – The final episode of "ACC Rewind," a program featuring re-airings of original (edited) broadcasts of "American Country Countdown" from the 1990s and early 2000s, is aired, and features the 1999 year-end countdown.  
December 31 –  Carrie Underwood announces on Instagram   that she is stepping down as host of the CMA awards

Top hits of the year 
The following songs placed within the Top 20 on the Hot Country Songs, Country Airplay, or Canada Country charts in 2019:

Singles released by American and Australian artists

Singles released by Canadian artists

Notes 
"—" denotes releases that did not chart

Top new album releases 
The following albums placed on the Top Country Albums charts in 2019:

Other top albums

Deaths
 January 1 – Pegi Young, 66, American singer-songwriter
 January 3 – Steve Ripley, 69, American musician, leader/producer of The Tractors, best known for "Baby Likes to Rock It".
 January 12 – Sanger D. Shafer, 84, American songwriter
 January 12 – Bonnie Guitar, 95, American country-pop artist and record label executive.
 January 17 – Reggie Young, 82, session guitarist
 January 21 – Maxine Brown, 87, final surviving member of The Browns
 January 31 – Harold Bradley, 93, American Hall of Fame country musician.
 February 20 – Fred Foster, 87, record producer and songwriter 
 February 24 – Mac Wiseman, 93, bluegrass singer
 April 6 – Jim Glaser, 81, youngest member of Tompall & the Glaser Brothers
April 10 – Earl Thomas Conley, 77, American singer-songwriter known for hits like "Holding Her and Loving You", "Fire and Smoke", and "Angel in Disguise" 
 May 14 – Leon Rausch, 91, member of The Texas Playboys
 June 10 – Chuck Glaser, 83, last surviving member of Tompall and the Glaser Brothers
 July 12 – Russell Smith, 70, American singer-songwriter (Amazing Rhythm Aces).
 August 27 – Donnie Fritts, 76, American session musician and songwriter.
September 4 – Kylie Rae Harris, 30, Texas country singer-songwriter (car accident)
September 5 – Jimmy Johnson, 76, American musician (Muscle Shoals Rhythm Section) and record producer.
September 18 – Chuck Dauphin, 45, American sports radio broadcaster and country music journalist, (complications from diabetes).
 September 29 – busbee, 43, songwriter and producer known for hits such as "Our Kind of Love" and "My Church" (brain cancer)
 October 17 – Bob Kingsley, 80, radio personality and longtime host of American Country Countdown and Bob Kingsley's Country Top 40 (bladder cancer) 
 October 20 – Nick Tosches, 69, American journalist, music critic and writer (Country).
 October 22 – Garry Koehler, 64, Australian country musician and songwriter, cancer.
 October 25 – Joe Sun, 76, American singer-songwriter best known for his 1978 hit "Old Flames Can't Hold a Candle to You", which would later become a #1 for Dolly Parton.

Hall of Fame inductees

Bluegrass Hall of Fame 
Mike Auldridge
Bill Emerson
The Kentucky Colonels

Country Music Hall of Fame inductees 
Jerry Bradley, producer and record executive, son of Owen Bradley and nephew of Harold Bradley.
Ray Stevens, country pop singer-songwriter and comedian (born 1939).
Brooks & Dunn, singer-songwriter duo composed of Kix Brooks (born 1955) and Ronnie Dunn (born 1953).

Canadian Country Music Hall of Fame inductees 
 Charlie Major
 Anya Wilson

Major awards

Academy of Country Music 
(presented in Nashville on September 16, 2020)
 Entertainer of the Year – Thomas Rhett and Carrie Underwood
 Male Vocalist of the Year – Luke Combs
 Female Vocalist of the Year – Maren Morris
 Vocal Duo of the Year – Dan + Shay
 Vocal Group of the Year – Old Dominion
 New Male Vocalist of the Year – Riley Green
 New Female Vocalist of the Year – Tenille Townes
 Songwriter of the Year – Hillary Lindsey
 Album of the Year – What You See Is What You Get (Luke Combs)
 Single of the Year – "God's Country" (Blake Shelton)
 Song of the Year – "One Man Band" (Matthew Ramsey, Trevor Rosen, Brad Tursi, Josh Osborne)
 Vocal Event of the Year – "Fooled Around and Fell in Love" (Miranda Lambert featuring Maren Morris, Ashley McBryde, Tenille Townes, Caylee Hammack, and Elle King)
 Video of the Year – "Remember You Young" (Thomas Rhett)

ACM Honors 
(presented August 21 in Nashville)
 Cliffie Stone Icon Award – Brooks & Dunn and Martina McBride
 Poet's Award – Rodney Crowell, Kye Fleming and Billy Joe Shaver
 Gary Haber Lifting Lives Award – Gayle Holcomb
 Gene Weed Milestone Award – Miranda Lambert
 Song of the Decade – "The House That Built Me" (awarded to Tom Douglas, Miranda Lambert and Allen Shamblin)
 Songwriter of the Year – Shane McAnally
 Jim Reeves International Award – Kacey Musgraves
 Tex Ritter Film Award – A Star Is Born

Americana Music Honors & Awards 
(presented on September 12, 2019)
 Album of the Year – The Tree of Forgiveness (John Prine)
 Artist of the Year – Brandi Carlile
 Duo/Group of the Year – I'm with Her
 Song of the Year – "Summer's End" (Pat McLaughlin and John Prine)
 Emerging Artist of the Year – The War and Treaty
 Instrumentalist of the Year – Chris Eldridge
 Spirit of Americana/Free Speech Award – Mavis Staples
 Legacy of Americana Award – Rhiannon Giddens and Frank Johnson
 Lifetime Achievement: Trailblazer – Maria Muldaur
 Lifetime Achievement: Performance – Delbert McClinton
 Lifetime Achievement: Songwriting – Elvis Costello
 President's Award – Felice and Boudleaux Bryant

American Music Awards 
Artist of the Decade – Taylor Swift
Artist of the Year – Taylor Swift
Favorite Country Male Artist – Kane Brown
Favorite Country Female Artist – Carrie Underwood
American Music Award for Favorite Country Band/Duo/Group – Dan + Shay
Country Album – Cry Pretty (Carrie Underwood)
Favorite Country Song – "Speechless" (Dan + Shay, Jordan Reynolds, Laura Veltz)

ARIA Awards 
Best Country Album – Things That We Drink To (Morgan Evans)

Billboard Music Awards 
Billboard Music Award for Top Country Artist – Luke Combs
Top Country Male Artist – Luke Combs
Top Country Female Artist – Carrie Underwood
Top Country Duo/Group – Dan + Shay
Top Country Album – This One's for You (Luke Combs)
Top Country Song – "Meant to Be" (Bebe Rexha and Florida Georgia Line)
Top Country Tour – Trip Around the Sun Tour (Kenny Chesney)

CMT Awards
(presented on June 5, 2019, in Nashville)
Video of the Year – "Cry Pretty" (Carrie Underwood)
Male Video of the Year – "Lose It" (Kane Brown)
Female Video of the Year – "Love Wins" (Carrie Underwood)
Duo Video of the Year – "Speechless" (Dan + Shay)
Group Video of the Year – "Someone I Used to Know" (Zac Brown Band)
Breakthrough Video of the Year – "Girl Going Nowhere" (Live at Marathon) (Ashley McBryde)
Collaborative Video of the Year – "Coming Home" (Keith Urban ft. Julia Michaels)
CMT Performance of the Year – "Beautiful Crazy" (Luke Combs and Leon Bridges) from CMT Crossroads

CMT Artists of the Year
 (presented October 16, 2019 in Nashville)
Kane Brown
Luke Combs
Dan + Shay
Thomas Rhett
Carrie Underwood

Country Music Association Awards
Entertainer of the Year – Garth Brooks
Male Vocalist of the Year – Luke Combs
Female Vocalist of the Year – Kacey Musgraves
Vocal Group of the Year – Old Dominion
New Artist of the Year – Ashley McBryde
Vocal Duo of the Year – Dan + Shay
Musician of the Year – Jenee Fleenor (fiddle)
Single of the Year – "God's Country" (Blake Shelton)
Song of the Year – "Beautiful Crazy" (Luke Combs, Wyatt Durrette, Robert Williford)
Album of the Year – Girl (Maren Morris)
Musical Event of the Year – "Old Town Road" (Lil Nas X and Billy Ray Cyrus)
Music Video of the Year – "Rainbow" (Kacey Musgraves, directed by Hannah Lux Davis)
International Artist Achievement Award – Kacey Musgraves
Jeff Walker Global Country Artist Award – Travis Collins (Australia) and Ward Thomas (UK)

Grammy Awards 
(presented in Los Angeles on January 26, 2020)
 Best Country Solo Performance – "Ride Me Back Home" (Willie Nelson)
 Best Country Duo/Group Performance – "Speechless" (Dan + Shay)
 Best Country Song – "Bring My Flowers Now" (Brandi Carlile, Phil Hanseroth, Tim Hanseroth, Tanya Tucker)
 Best Country Album – ''While I'm Livin' (Tanya Tucker)
 Best Bluegrass Album – Tall Fiddler (Michael Cleveland)
 Best Americana Album – Oklahoma (Keb' Mo')
 Best American Roots Performance – "Saint Honesty" (Sara Bareilles)
 Best American Roots Song – "Call My Name" (Sarah Jarosz, Aoife O'Donovan, Sara Watkins)
 Best Roots Gospel Album – Testimony (Gloria Gaynor)

International Bluegrass Music Association Awards 
(presented on September 26, 2019)
 Entertainer of the Year – Joe Mullins and the Radio Ramblers
 Male Vocalist of the Year – Russell Moore
 Female Vocalist of the Year – Brooke Aldridge
 Vocal Group of the Year – Sister Sadie
 Instrumental Group of the Year – Michael Cleveland and Flamekeeper
 New Artist of the Year – Billy Strings
 Guitar Player of the Year – Billy Strings
 Banjo Player of the Year – Kristin Scott Benson
 Mandolin Player of the Year – Alan Bibey
 Fiddle Player of the Year – Michael Cleveland
 Bass Player of the Year – Missy Raines
 Dobro Player of the Year – Phil Leadbetter
 Album of the Year – Del McCoury Still Sings Bluegrass (Del McCoury)
 Song of the Year – "Thunder Dan" (Sideline)
 Collaborative Recording of the Year – "The Guitar Song" (Joe Mullins and the Radio Ramblers with Del McCoury)
 Instrumental Recorded Performance of the Year – "Darlin' Pals of Mine" (Missy Raines ft. Alison Brown, Mike Bub and Todd Phillips)
 Gospel Recorded Performance of the Year – "Gonna Sing, Gonna Shout" (Claire Lynch)

Juno Awards 
(presented on June 29, 2020)
Country Album of the Year – Wild As Me (Meghan Patrick)
Contemporary Roots Album of the Year – Mohawk (Lee Harvey Osmond)
Traditional Roots Album of the Year - Sugar & Joy (The Dead South)

See also
 Country Music Association
 Inductees of the Country Music Hall of Fame

References

Country
Country music by year
Culture-related timelines by year